This is a list of African cichlid species that are commonly kept by aquarists. 

Another African cichlid is a Frontosa (Cyphotilapia frontosa) which is commonly found in Lake Tanganyika. It grows to about 10-14 inches has minimal aggression and is stripy.

References 

'